Ronnie Carl Monaco (born 1963) is a former linebacker in the National Football League. He played with the St. Louis Cardinals during the 1986 NFL season and the Green Bay Packers during the 1987 NFL season.

See also
List of Green Bay Packers players

References

South Carolina Gamecocks football players
St. Louis Cardinals (football) players
Green Bay Packers players
American football linebackers
1963 births
Living people